A GABA analogue is a compound which is an analogue or derivative of the neurotransmitter gamma-Aminobutyric acid (GABA) (the IUPAC of which is 4-aminobutanoic acid).

Many GABA analogues are used as drugs, especially as anticonvulsants, sedatives, and anxiolytics,any of the drugs
Binds with selective receptor are becomes channel opens

List of GABA analogues

Deaminated
 Butyric acid (butanoic acid) – histone deacetylase inhibitor and full agonist of free fatty acid receptor 2, free fatty acid receptor 3, and niacin receptor 1
 Derivatives: butyrate (butanoate), sodium butyrate, methyl butyrate, ethyl butyrate, butyl butyrate, pentyl butyrate
 Valeric acid (pentanoic acid) – constituent of valerian; has an unpleasant odor and fruity flavor and esters are used as additives
 Derivatives: valerate (pentanoate), methyl valerate, ethyl valerate, pentyl valerate
 Isovaleric acid (isopentanoic acid/3-methylbutanoic acid) – constituent of valerian; has anticonvulsant effects; PAM of the GABAA receptor
 Derivatives: isovalerate (isopentanoate/3-methylbutanoate), menthyl isovalerate (validolum) – used as an anxiolytic and sedative in Russia
 Isovaleramide (isopentamide/3-methylbutanamide) – constituent of valerian; has anxiolytic and sedative effects; PAM of the GABAA receptor
 Valproic acid (2-propylpentanoic acid) – anticonvulsant/mood stabilizer; inhibitor of HDAC, SSADH, and GABA-T, blocker of VDSCs and GABA reuptake, AR/PR antagonist
 Derivatives: sodium valproate, valproate semisodium, divalproex sodium, valproate pivoxil
 Valpromide (2-propylpentanamide) – anticonvulsant; same mechanism of action as valproic acid, plus inhibitor of epoxide hydrolase
 Valnoctamide (2-ethyl-3-methylpentanamide) – anticonvulsant; similar mechanism of action to valproic acid; structural isomer of valpromide

3- or 4-Hydroxylated
 3-Hydroxybutanal – synthetic hypnotic and sedative drug
 GHB (γ-hydroxybutyric acid) – neurotransmitter, drug of abuse; agonist of GHB receptor and GABAB receptor
 Derivatives: sodium oxybate (sodium γ-hydroxybutanoate) – used to treat narcolepsy; same mechanism of action as GHB
 Aceburic acid (γ-hydroxybutyric acid acetate) – synthetic prodrug to GHB
 GBL (γ-hydroxybutyric acid lactone) – metabolic intermediate and prodrug to GHB
 GHBAL (γ-hydroxybutyraldehyde or γ-hydroxybutanal) – metabolic intermediate and prodrug to GHB
 GHV (γ-hydroxyvaleric acid) – designer drug; analogue of GHB with similar effects
 GVL (γ-valerolactone) – designer drug; prodrug to GHV
 T-HCA/GHC (γ-hydroxycrotonic acid) – neurotransmitter; GHB receptor agonist
 GCL (γ-crotonolactone) – prodrug to T-HCA/GHC
 HOCPCA (3-hydroxycyclopent-1-enecarboxylic acid) – synthetic GHB receptor agonist
 UMB68 (γ-hydroxy-γ-methylpentanoic acid) – synthetic GHB receptor agonist

β-Substituted
 GABOB (β-hydroxy-GABA) – anticonvulsant; GABA receptor agonist
 Pregabalin (β-isobutyl-GABA) – analgesic, anticonvulsant, anxiolytic, and drug of abuse; potent inhibitor of α2δ subunit-containing VGCCs.
 Phenibut (β-phenyl-GABA) – sedative and anxiolytic from Russia; inhibitor of α2δ subunit-containing VGCCs and, to a lesser extent, GABAB receptor agonist.
 Baclofen (β-(4-chlorophenyl)-GABA) – antispasmodic drug; potent GABAB receptor agonist, weak inhibitor of α2δ subunit-containing VGCCs
 Tolibut (β-(4-methylphenyl)-GABA) – analgesic, tranquilizing, and neuroprotective drug
 Phaclofen (phosphonobaclofen) – GABAB receptor antagonist
 Saclofen (sulfonobaclofen) – GABAB receptor antagonist

Cyclized
 Arecaidine – constituent of areca nuts; GABA reuptake inhibitor
 Gabaculine – neurotoxin; GABA-T inhibitor and GABA reuptake inhibitor
 Gabapentin – anticonvulsant; inhibitor of α2δ subunit-containing VGCCs
 Gabapentin enacarbil – used for the treatment of restless legs syndrome and postherpetic neuralgia; same mechanism of action as gabapentin
 Gaboxadol – GABAA receptor agonist
 Guvacine – constituent of areca nuts; GABA reuptake inhibitor
 Isoguvacine – GABAA receptor agonist
 Isonipecotic acid – GABAA receptor partial agonist
 Muscimol – constituent of Amanita muscaria mushrooms; GABAA receptor agonist
 Nipecotic acid – used in scientific research; GABA reuptake inhibitor

GABA prodrugs
 L-Glutamine – endogenous precursor of GABA and glutamate
 N-Isonicotinoyl-GABA – structural isomer of picamilon
 Picamilon (N-nicotinoyl-GABA) – dietary supplement and prescription drug in Russia
 Progabide (complex structure) – anticonvulsant
 Tolgabide (complex structure) – anticonvulsant

Others/miscellaneous
 1,4-Butanediol – metabolic intermediate and prodrug to GHB
 3-Methyl-GABA – GABA-T activator
 AABA/homoalanine (α-aminobutyric acid) – used by nonribosomal peptide synthetases
 BABA (β-aminobutyric acid) – known for its ability to induce plant disease resistance
 DAVA (δ-aminopentanoic acid) – GABA receptor agonist
 Gabamide (γ-aminobutanamide) – GABA receptor agonist
 Gabazine (SR-95531) – antagonist of the GABAA and GHB receptors
 GAVA (γ-aminopentanoic acid) – GABA reuptake inhibitor
 Glufimet (dimethyl 3-phenylglutamate hydrochloride) – experimental drug related to phenibut
 Glutamic acid (glutamate) – neurotransmitter
 Homotaurine (tramiprosate) – GABAA receptor agonist, GABAB receptor antagonist
 Hopantenic acid (N-pantoyl-GABA) – central nervous system depressant used in Russia
 Isovaline – peripherally selective agonist of the GABAB receptor
 Lesogaberan (AZD-3355) – agonist of the GABAB receptor
 N-Anisoyl-GABA – major active metabolite of the nootropic aniracetam
 NCS-382 – antagonist of the GHB receptor
 Piracetam and other racetams – nootropics
 Pivagabine (N-pivaloyl-GABA) – antidepressant/anxiolytic drug; CRF inhibitor
 Vigabatrin (y-vinyl-GABA) – anticonvulsant; GABA-T inhibitor

See also
 Bamaluzole
 Bicuculline
 Deramciclane
 Ethanol
 Fengabine
 Gabapentinoid
 Loreclezole
 Propofol
 Retigabine/ezogabine
 Tiagabine
 Valerenic acid

References

 
GABA receptor agonists